Risto-Veikko Luukkonen (25 June 1902, Mikkeli – 7 September 1972, Helsinki) was a Finnish architect. He is best known for designing the Töölö Sports Hall and the Olympia Terminal in Helsinki together with Aarne Hytönen, both of which are listed by Docomomo (a global organization preserving modernist architecture) as significant examples of modern architecture in Finland.

Works
 Töölö Sports Hall, Helsinki (1935) – together with Aarne Hytönen
 Finnish pavilion at the Brussels International Exposition (1935) – together with Aarne Hytönen
 Suomi-yhtiö office building, Helsinki (1938) – together with Aarne Hytönen
 Turku Concert Hall (1952) 
 Olympia Terminal, Helsinki (1953) – together with Aarne Hytönen
 Valkeakoski Town Hall (1955) – together with Aarne Hytönen
 Turku City Theatre (1962) – together with Helmer Stenroos
 Kuopio City Theatre (1963) – together with Helmer Stenroos
 State Office Building, Turku (1967) – together with Helmer Stenroos

References

External links

1902 births
1972 deaths
People from Mikkeli
People from Mikkeli Province (Grand Duchy of Finland)
20th-century Finnish architects